Ivan Večenaj (18 May 1920 – 13 February 2013; Koprivnica, Croatia) was a Croatian painter. His works can be found at the Croatian Museum of Naïve Art in Zagreb.

References

External links 
 Večenaj - Private web site

1920 births
2013 deaths
Croatian naïve painters
20th-century Croatian painters
Croatian male painters
21st-century Croatian painters
21st-century male artists
Yugoslav painters
20th-century Croatian male artists